Flyways Linhas Aéreas Ltda. was a domestic airline based in Rio de Janeiro, Brazil, founded in 2014.  The company slogan was

History
Flyways was founded on June 11, 2014. The concession to operate air services was granted on December 16, 2015 by the National Civil Aviation Agency of Brazil. Flights started on December 28, 2015.

On 15 July 2016 the airline was grounded for maintenance of its sole aircraft and there is no set date to become airborne again.

On 8 March 2018 the concession to operate air services was revoked by the National Civil Aviation Agency of Brazil

On 12 August 2019 during a tow to be scrapped, the tractor was not able to hold the weight of the ATR 72-200 fuselage and suffered an accident with no injuries. On the following day, the metal successfully reached the scrap yard.

Destinations
Flyways operated flights to the following cities:

Fleet
The Flyways fleet consisted of the following aircraft (as of August 2016):

Airline affinity program
Flyways had no frequent flyer program.

See also
List of defunct airlines of Brazil

References

Defunct airlines of Brazil
Airlines established in 2014
Airlines disestablished in 2017
2017 disestablishments in Brazil